SS Charles Carroll was a Liberty ship built in the United States during World War II. She was named after Charles Carroll, a wealthy Maryland planter and an early advocate of independence from the Kingdom of Great Britain and one of the signers of the United States Declaration of Independence. He is one of the Founding Fathers of the United States and served as a delegate to the Continental Congress and Confederation Congress. Carroll later served as the first United States Senator for Maryland. He was the last surviving signatory of the Declaration of Independence.

Construction
Charles Carroll was laid down on 15 May 1941, under a Maritime Commission (MARCOM) contract, MCE hull 15, by the Bethlehem-Fairfield Shipyard, Baltimore, Maryland; and was launched on 25 October 1941.

History
Charles Carroll was allocated to American Export Lines, on 19 January 1942. On 26 April 1946, she was laid up in the Hudson River Reserve Fleet, Jones Point, New York. On 12 May 1953, Charles Carroll was withdrawn from the fleet to be loaded with grain under the "Grain Program 1953", she returned loaded on 25 May 1953. On 20 May 1956, she was withdrawn to be unload, she returned reloaded with grain 9 June 1956. On 27 April 1963, she was withdrawn from the fleet to be unloaded, she returned empty on 4 May 1963. Charles Carroll was sold for scrapping on 3 September 1970, to Union Minerals & Alloys Corp. She was removed from the fleet, 4 December 1970.

References

Bibliography

 
 
 
 

 

Liberty ships
1941 ships
Ships built in Baltimore
Hudson River Reserve Fleet
Hudson River Reserve Fleet Grain Program
Ships named for Founding Fathers of the United States